Sowunmi is a surname. It may refer to:
Margaret Adebisi Sowunmi (born 1939), Nigerian botanist and environmental archaeologist
Omar Sowunmi (born 1995), English football player
Thomas Sowunmi (born 1978), Nigerian-born retired Hungarian international football player